Eucalyptus dendromorpha, the Budawang ash or giant mallee ash is a species of tree endemic to southeastern Australia. It has rough, compacted bark on the lower part of the trunk, smooth white to cream-coloured bark above, lance-shaped to curved adult leaves, flower buds in groups of between seven and eleven, white flowers and cup-shaped or barrel-shaped fruit.

Description
It has rough, compacted scaly, flaky or short-fibrous bark on the base of the trunk, smooth grey or white bark above, the smooth bark often with insect scribbles. Flowering mainly occurs in December and January and the flowers are white.

Taxonomy and naming
Budawang ash was first formally described in 1941 by William Blakely from a specimen collected by Richard Hind Cambage in West Albion Park near MacquariePass. Blakely gave it the name Eucalyptus obtusiflora var. dendromorpha and published the description in The Australian Naturalist. In 1972 Lawrie Johnson and Donald Blaxell raised the variety to species status as E. dendromorpha. The specific epithet (dendromorpha) is derived from the Ancient Greek words dendron meaning "tree" and morphe meaning "form" or "shape", referring to the habit of this species, compared to the mallee E. obtusiflora.
 
This species is similar to the white ash, but has differently coloured juvenile leaves and seeds.

Distribution and habitat
Eucalyptus dendromorpha grows in forest on the ranges south from Mount Tomah in the Blue Mountains to Monga near Braidwood.

References

Myrtales of Australia
Flora of New South Wales
Trees of Australia
Plants described in 1941
Taxa named by William Blakely